Scripta may stand for:

 Jussi Halla-aho's Finnish-language blog Scripta
 The owner of Hungarian-language Romanian newspaper Új Magyar Szó

Other Scriptas:
 Scripta continua aka word divider
 Scripta Mathematica, quarterly journal published by Yeshiva University devoted to the philosophy, history, and expository treatment of mathematics